C. magna  may refer to:
 Cavia magna, the greater guinea pig, a guinea pig species found in Argentina, Brazil and Uruguay
 Chaetopsis magna, a picture-winged fly species

See also
 Magna (disambiguation)